The 1996 AFL Lightning Premiership was an Australian rules football knock-out competition, played in its entirety before the Australian Football League's main pre-season competition began. The Lightning Premiership was held for the only time in the modern era in 1996 - the Centenary Season of the AFL. It was a knock-out competition played from Friday, 9 February until Sunday, 11 February, with four games each evening at Waverley Park, each consisting of two 17.5-minute halves. The game trialled a number of highly experimental rules, including three points awarded both for deliberate rushed behinds and balls which hit the goalposts, and timekeepers not blowing the siren if scores were tied. However, the rule which altered play most significantly was the ball not being thrown in from the boundary line after travelling out of bounds, a free kick being awarded instead against the last team to touch the ball. Essendon won the title defeating Brisbane by 17 points in the Grand Final.

Rules
Each game consisted of two 17-minute halves, with a five-minute half-time break
In the case of a tie after normal time, the siren would not sound until another score had been registered
Four boundary and four goal umpires were used
Three points were awarded if the ball hit the post, signalled by a different coloured flag
Three points were awarded for a deliberately rushed behind
The last player to touch the ball before it went over the boundary line was penalised and a free kick awarded to the opposing team. When it could not be determined who touched the ball last, it was thrown back in
The defender kicking in after a score did not have to wait until the goal umpire finished waving his flags
No umpire would bounce the ball, instead it was thrown up on all occasions
Six-man interchange bench

Matches

Round 1

|- bgcolor="#CCCCFF"
| Match
| Home team
| Home team score
| Away team
| Away team score
| Ground
| Date
| Time
|- bgcolor="#FFFFFF"
| 1.
| North Melbourne
| 3.5 (23)
| Melbourne
| 3.4 (22)
| Waverley Park
| Friday, 9 February
| 6:30pm
|- bgcolor="#FFFFFF"
| 2.
| Fitzroy
| 2.5 (17)
| Collingwood
| 6.4 (40)
| Waverley Park
| Friday, 9 February
| 7:30pm
|- bgcolor="#FFFFFF"
| 3.
| St Kilda
| 7.8 (50)
| Hawthorn
| 3.2 (20)
| Waverley Park
| Friday, 9 February
| 8:30pm
|- bgcolor="#FFFFFF"
| 4.
| Brisbane
| 6.4 (40)
| Carlton
| 3.8 (26)
| Waverley Park
| Friday, 9 February
| 9:30pm
|- bgcolor="#FFFFFF"
| 5.
| West Coast
| 4.8 (32)
| Richmond
| 6.1 (37)
| Waverley Park
| Saturday, 10 February
| 11:00am
|- bgcolor="#FFFFFF"
| 6.
| Adelaide
| 6.6 (42)
| Fremantle
| 8.7 (55)
| Waverley Park
| Saturday, 10 February
| 12:00pm
|- bgcolor="#FFFFFF"
| 7.
| Geelong
| 6.7 (43)
| Essendon
| 10.7 (67)
| Waverley Park
| Saturday, 10 February
| 1:00pm
|- bgcolor="#FFFFFF"
| 8.
| Sydney
| 6.6 (42)
| Footscray
| 6.4 (40)
| Waverley Park
| Saturday, 10 February
| 2:00pm

Quarter-finals

|- bgcolor="#CCCCFF"
| Match
| Home team
| Home team score
| Away team
| Away team score
| Ground
| Date
| Time
|- bgcolor="#FFFFFF"
| 9.
| North Melbourne
| 5.6 (36)
| Collingwood
| 6.7 (43)
| Waverley Park
| Saturday, 10 February
| 6:30pm
|- bgcolor="#FFFFFF"
| 10.
| St Kilda
| 3.3 (21)
| Brisbane
| 6.7 (43)
| Waverley Park
| Saturday, 10 February
| 7:30pm
|- bgcolor="#FFFFFF"
| 11.
| Richmond
| 5.1 (31)
| Fremantle
| 8.13 (61)
| Waverley Park
| Saturday, 10 February
| 8:30pm
|- bgcolor="#FFFFFF"
| 12.
| Essendon
| 7.13 (55)
| Sydney
| 3.10 (28)
| Waverley Park
| Saturday, 10 February
| 9:30pm

Semi-finals

|- bgcolor="#CCCCFF"
| Match
| Home team
| Home team score
| Away team
| Away team score
| Ground
| Date
| Time
|- bgcolor="#FFFFFF"
| 13.
| Collingwood
| 4.2 (26)
| Brisbane
| 7.13 (55)
| Waverley Park
| Sunday, 11 February
| 6:30pm
|- bgcolor="#FFFFFF"
| 14.
| Fremantle
| 5.8 (38)
| Essendon
| 6.11 (47)
| Waverley Park
| Sunday, 11 February
| 7:30pm

Grand final

|- bgcolor="#CCCCFF"
| Match
| Home team
| Home team score
| Away team
| Away team score
| Ground
| Date
| Time
|- bgcolor="#FFFFFF"
| 15.
| Brisbane
| 2.9 (21)
| Essendon
| 6.2 (38)
| Waverley Park
| Sunday, 11 February
| 9:30pm

Summary of results

See also
List of VFL/AFL pre-season and night series premiers
1996 Ansett Australia Cup
1996 AFL season

References

Australian Football League pre-season competition
Afl Lightning Premiership, 1996